Perthville is a small town in New South Wales, Australia. The town has evolved over time due to road improvements to be a satellite suburb of Bathurst.

Perthville had a railway station, now closed, on the Main Western line between Bathurst and Blayney.

The town contains a large convent of the Sisters of St Joseph, founded in 1872. This included a girls boarding school.

The Uniting Church has also been strongly represented in the town.

Cricketer Brian Booth was born in Perthville in 1933.

References

External links
Perthville - Bathurst Regional Council
Community website
Perthville and Georges Plains - Bathurst-nsw

Towns in New South Wales
Main Western railway line, New South Wales